"Mellow Yellow" is a song written and recorded by Scottish singer-songwriter Donovan. In the US, it reached No. 2 on the Billboard Hot 100. Outside the US, "Mellow Yellow" peaked at No. 8 in the UK in early 1967.

Content
The song was rumoured to be about smoking dried banana skins, which was believed to be a hallucinogenic drug in the 1960s, though this aspect of bananas has since been debunked. According to Donovan's notes, accompanying the album Donovan's Greatest Hits, the rumour that one could get high from smoking dried banana skins was started by Country Joe McDonald in 1966, and Donovan heard the rumour three weeks before "Mellow Yellow" was released as a single.
 
According to The Rolling Stone Illustrated Encyclopedia of Rock and Roll, he admitted later the song made reference to a vibrator; an "electrical banana" as mentioned in the lyrics. Donovan stated, "I was reading a newspaper and on the back there was an ad for a yellow dildo called the mellow yellow," he said. "Really, you know the 'electric banana' was right in there and gave it away. And that's what the song's about." This definition was re-affirmed in an interview with NME magazine: "it's about being cool, laid-back, and also the electrical bananas that were appearing on the scene – which were ladies' vibrators."

Paul McCartney can be heard as one of the background revellers on this track, but the "quite rightly" whispering lines in the chorus is not McCartney, but rather Donovan himself. Donovan had a small part in coming up with the lyrics for "Yellow Submarine", and McCartney played bass guitar (uncredited) on portions of Donovan's Mellow Yellow album.

In 2005, the track was remastered by EMI Records for the Mellow Yellow album re-issue.

Reception
Cash Box called "Mellow Yellow" an "easy-going, sophisticated blues number which should be a giant."

Covers and adaptations
"Mellow Yellow" was covered in 1967 by soul singer Big Maybelle on her album Got a Brand New Bag. It was also covered in 1968 by British R&B singer/keyboardist Georgie Fame on his album The Third Face of Fame.

In 1999, "Mellow Yellow" was sung by a group of young adults, among whom were then-unknowns Alex Greenwald, Rashida Jones and Jason Thompson, in Gap's "Everybody in Cords" commercial directed by Pedro Romhanyi. The music mix was done by the Dust Brothers. In 2015 the song was covered by Spanish singer Abraham Mateo for promotion of the film Minions. The original by Donovan was used in the film's ending titles. In Brazil Michel Teló covered the song, adapted to Portuguese, also for the movie.

Chart performance

Weekly charts

Year-end charts

References

External links
Mellow Yellow (Single) – Donovan Unofficial Site

1966 songs
1966 singles
1967 singles
Donovan songs
Epic Records singles
Psychedelic songs
Pye Records singles
Song recordings produced by Mickie Most
Songs written by Donovan